Black Mountain Side is a 2014 Canadian indie Horror thriller directed by Nick Szostakiwskyj and starring Shane Twerdun, Michael Dickson, Carl Toftfelt, Marc Anthony Williams, Andrew Moxham, Timothy Lyle, and Steve Bradley. It was the first film released by the Canadian production company A Farewell To Kings Entertainment Company. The film centers upon a group of archaeologists who discover an ancient structure.

Premise
A group of archaeologists discover an ancient structure in the Arctic North. The associated artifacts buried deep beneath sediment and ice dating back to approximately 14,000 years before present day, at the closing of the last ice age. While the group examines and evaluates this discovery, things start to go awry: The site's native workers leave, communications fail, supplies stop coming, and the men begin to feel odd physical and psychological effects, all compounded by the solitude thrust upon them.

Cast

Release
Black Mountain Side premiered July 30, 2014 at the Fantasia International Film Festival, where it was named Best Horror Film by the critics at Cult Montreal, who stated: "Its tension and sense of isolation were unparalleled this year; it is also reminiscent of The Thing and Lovecraft's At the Mountains of Madness. It squarely plants itself in the increasingly popular genre of Canadian horror films addressing the implications of global warming and the subsequent Arctic thaw. The other honourable mentions are Eli Roth's The Green Inferno, and Mark Duplass's Creep."

Reception
Critical reception for Black Mountain Side has been positive. Bloody Disgusting praised the film, and IndieWire called it "a solid addition to the movie tradition of arctic thrillers". Ain't it Cool News also praised the movie, writing "Black Mountain Side is expertly made and gorgeous to look at." Film School Rejects also reviewed the movie positively, stating that "Black Mountain Side is a beautifully-shot, creepy love letter to John Carpenter's The Thing that finds its own identity amid the paranoia and bloodletting."

LetterBoxd currently lists the film at 3 out of 5 stars.

Awards
Best Feature at the HP Lovecraft Film Festival (2015, won)
Best Screenplay at the HP Lovecraft Film Festival (2013, won)
Best Cinematography at the Blood in the Snow Canadian Film Festival (2015, won)
Best Cinematography at the Leo Awards (2015, Nominated)
Best Sound Editing at the Leo Awards (2015, Nominated)

References

External links
 
 
 

2014 films
2014 horror films
Canadian thriller films
Canadian science fiction horror films
English-language Canadian films
2014 directorial debut films
2010s English-language films
2010s Canadian films